Marian Klopcic (born 14 January 1992) is an Austrian handball player for Bregenz Handball and the Austrian national team.

References

1992 births
Living people
Austrian male handball players
Sportspeople from Klagenfurt